La Dernière Heure (The Latest Hour) and Les Sports (sometimes referred to as La DH) is a French-language daily newspaper published in Brussels, Belgium. The paper is known for news and sports.

History and profile

La DH was established on 19 April  1906. The paper has its headquarters in Brussels and has a liberal stance without any political affiliation. Its publisher is IPM. It has seven regional versions: Namur / Luxembourg, Liège, Tournai / Ath / Mouscron, Mons Center, Charleroi Center, Brabant, and Brussels. 

In 1990 La DH sold 445,000 copies. The 2002 circulation of the paper was 112,000 copies with a market share of 17.5%.

According to CIM, in 2018-2019, La DH-Les Sports+ recorded 404,720 readers, combining the digital and paper versions.

References

External link

1906 establishments in Belgium
French-language newspapers published in Belgium
Newspapers published in Brussels
Newspapers established in 1906